Yelena Aleksandrovna Vlasova-Afanasyeva (born March 1, 1967, in Kulebaki) is a former Russian athlete who competed in the 800 metres. Her greatest achievements include a European title as well as a 1997 World Championships silver medal. The same year she achieved the time of 1:56.61 minutes in Zurich. Afanasyeva retired after the 2001 season.

International competitions

See also
List of World Athletics Championships medalists (women)
List of IAAF World Indoor Championships medalists (women)
List of European Athletics Championships medalists (women)
List of European Athletics Indoor Championships medalists (women)
800 metres at the World Championships in Athletics

References

1967 births
Living people
People from Nizhny Novgorod Oblast
Sportspeople from Nizhny Novgorod Oblast
Russian female middle-distance runners
Olympic female middle-distance runners
Olympic athletes of Russia
Athletes (track and field) at the 1996 Summer Olympics
World Athletics Championships athletes for Russia
World Athletics Championships medalists
European Athletics Championships winners
European Athletics Championships medalists
Russian Athletics Championships winners